Queenie Rynjah is a social worker and educationist from Indian state of Meghalaya. She was awarded Padma Shri award by Government of India in 2004 for her contribution.

References 

Writers from Meghalaya
Recipients of the Padma Shri in social work
Indian women educational theorists
Living people
Year of birth missing (living people)
Social workers
20th-century Indian social scientists
20th-century Indian women scientists
Women writers from Meghalaya
20th-century Indian educational theorists
Social workers from Meghalaya
Women educators from Meghalaya
Educators from Meghalaya
20th-century women writers
20th-century women educators